The following is a list of notable deaths in February 2006.

Entries for each day are listed alphabetically by surname. A typical entry lists information in the following sequence:
 Name, age, country of citizenship at birth, subsequent country of citizenship (if applicable), reason for notability, cause of death (if known), and reference.

February 2006

1

Roy Alon, 63, British film stuntman (James Bond), heart attack.
Dick Bass, 68, American pro football player and radio analyst.
Dick Brooks, 63, American NASCAR race car driver and radio broadcaster, heart attack.
 Ronald B. Cameron, 78, American politician, U.S. Representative from California (1963–1967).
Robin Donkin, 78, British historian and geographer.
Ernest Dudley, 97, British novelist, journalist, screenwriter, actor, radio broadcaster.
Carlson Gracie, Sr., 72, Brazilian martial artist, complications from kidney stones.
Samuel Pearson Goddard, Jr., 86, American politician, Governor of Arizona 1965–1967.
Bryce Harland, 74, New Zealand diplomat, Permanent Representative to the United Nations (1982–1985), High Commissioner to the United Kingdom (1985–1991).
Jean-Philippe Maitre, 56, Swiss politician, former President of the Swiss National Council, brain tumor.
John Woollam, 78, British politician, former Conservative Member of Parliament.

2

Armando Castillo, 73, Guatemalan Olympic cyclist.
Jill Chaifetz, 41, American lawyer and executive director of the nonprofit legal group Advocates for Children of New York, ovarian cancer.
Mizanur Rahman Chowdhury, 77, Bangladeshi politician, former prime minister of Bangladesh.
Chris Doty, 39, Canadian documentarian and playwright, suicide.
Guglielmo Letteri, 80, Italian comic book artist.
Pat Rupp, 63, American ice hockey player, goaltender for the 1964 and 1968 Olympic ice hockey teams, cancer.
S. K. Ramachandra Rao, 78, Indian scholar.
Athol Shephard, 85, Australian cricketer.
Nicholas Swarbrick, 107, English sailor, one of the last two surviving World War I Merchant Navy veterans.
Sir Reginald Swartz, 94, Australian politician, Minister for Civil Aviation from 1966 to 1969.
Chris Walton, 72, English cricketer.
Stephen Worobetz, 91, Canadian politician, former lieutenant governor of Saskatchewan.

3

Ustad Qawwal Bahauddin, 72, Indian-Pakistani Qawwali singer.
Walerian Borowczyk, 82, Polish-born surrealist filmmaker, heart failure.
Jean Byron, 80, American actress (The Patty Duke Show, The Many Loves of Dobie Gillis, Johnny Concho), infection following hip replacement surgery.
Ernie Clements, 83, British road racing cyclist.
Frank Ellis, 100, British radiologist.
Frank Goodman, 89, American Broadway press agent, congestive heart failure.
Lou Jones, 74, American Olympic runner.
Sonny King, 83, American comedian-singer, Jimmy Durante's sidekick, cancer.
Duma Kumalo, 48, South African human rights activist, one of the Sharpeville Six, film-maker and founding member of the Khulumani Support Group for victims of apartheid-related violence.
Al Lewis, 82, American actor (The Munsters, Car 54, Where Are You?).
Romano Mussolini, 78, Italian jazz musician and painter.
Denne Petitclerc, 76, American journalist, screenwriter, and friend of Ernest Hemingway.
Johnny Vaught, 96, American college football player, coach, and college athletics administrator, NCAA championship-winning University of Mississippi football coach.

4

Jack Taylor (heavyweight man), once heaviest man in UK.
Jenő Dalnoki, 73, Hungarian Olympic football player and manager (1952 gold medal, 1960 bronze medal).
Friedrich Engel, 97, German Nazi SS officer.
Betty Friedan, 85, American feminist and writer, congestive heart failure.
William Augustus Jones Jr., 71, American Civil Rights pioneer.
Barbara W. Leyden, 56, American palynologist and paleoecologist.
Joe McGuff, 79, American sportswriter and newspaper editor, amyotrophic lateral sclerosis (Lou Gehrig's Disease).
Elena Carter Richardson, 57, Mexican-born principal dancer and teacher, cancer.
Myron Waldman, 97, American animator for Betty Boop and Superman cartoons, congestive heart failure.

5

Norma Candal, 75, Puerto Rican comedian, actress and drama teacher, head injury.
Franklin Cover, 77, American actor (The Jeffersons, Wall Street, The Stepford Wives), pneumonia.
Reuven Frank, 85, American TV journalism pioneer and former NBC News president, complications from pneumonia.
Stuart Mason, 57, English footballer.
Ray Owen, 65, English rugby league player and administrator.
Peter Philp, 85, British dramatist and antiques expert.
Sir Alberto Rodrigues, 94, Hong Kong physician and politician.
Jack Taylor, 60, one of the heaviest men in Britain, heart attack.

6

John Brightman, Baron Brightman, 94, UK lawyer and former Lord of Appeal.
Mario Condello, 53, Australian lawyer and gangland criminal, shot.
Pedro Gonzalez-Gonzalez, 80, American comedian and actor, cancer.
Stella Ross-Craig, 99, English illustrator, one of the most prodigious of flora illustrators.
Esther Sandoval, 78, Puerto Rican actress.
Karin Struck, 58, German writer, cancer.
Kouji Totani, 57, Japanese voice actor, heart failure.

7

Glenn Lee Benner II, 43, American convicted murderer, executed by lethal injection.
Sándor Garay, 86, Hungarian Olympic athlete.
George Millay, 76, American businessman and founder of SeaWorld, lung cancer.
Max Rosenn, 96, American judge on the U.S. Court of Appeals for the Third Circuit (1970–2006).
Mitchell Rupe, 51, American convicted murderer ruled too heavy to be hanged, liver disease.
Alan Shalleck, 76, American TV writer, director (Curious George animated films), murdered.

8

Larry Black, 54, American track and field medalist at 1972 Summer Olympics, aneurysm.
Elton Dean, 60, English jazz saxophonist, heart and liver related problems.
Michael Gilbert, 93, British mystery author and lawyer.
Ron Greenwood, 84, British football manager, England national team, West Ham United.
Akira Ifukube, 91, Japanese film composer, best known for Godzilla film series.
Mart Kenney, 95, Canadian jazz musician and bandleader, "Canada's Big Band King," complications from a fall.
Gigi Parrish, 92, American actress, later known as Katherine Weld.
Kuljeet Randhawa, 30, Indian television actress, suicide.

9

Phil Brown, 89, American actor (Star Wars).
Ibolya Csák, 91, Hungarian athlete, 1936 Olympic gold medalist in women's high jump.
Gilles Kahn, 59, French computer scientist.
Sir Freddie Laker, 83, British entrepreneur, founder of Laker Airways.
Nadira, 75, Indian Bollywood actress.
Laurie Z, 48, American musician, lung cancer.

10

John Belluso, 36, American playwright, Engleman-Camurdrie syndrome.
Fernando Pereira de Freitas, 71, Brazilian Olympic basketball player.
Jill Fraser, 59, British theatre director, cancer.
Dick Harmon, 58, American golfer and golf instructor.
Knut-Olaf Haustein, 71, German physician.
John Prentice, 79, Scottish football player and manager.
Norman Shumway, 83, American surgeon, performed first U.S. heart transplant, lung cancer.
Peter Smith, 65, British trade union leader, oesophageal cancer.
Juan Soriano, 85, Mexican painter and sculptor.
André Strappe, 77, French football player.
James Yancey aka J Dilla, 32, American hip hop record producer and MC, lupus nephritis.

11

Peter Benchley, 65, American author and screenwriter (Jaws, The Deep), pulmonary fibrosis.
Peggy Cripps Appiah, 84, British-Ghanaian children's author.
Ken Fletcher, 65, Australian tennis player, cancer.
Jackie "Mr. TV" Pallo, 79, British professional wrestler, cancer.
Harry Schein, 81, Austrian-born founder of Swedish Film Institute, author and columnist.
Jockey Shabalala, 62, South African singer with Ladysmith Black Mambazo.
Thomas A. Spragens, 88, American educator, former President of Centre College.
Harry Vines, 67, American wheelchair basketball coach.

12

Lenny Dee, 83, American virtuoso organist.
Henri Guédon, 61, French percussionist.
Pamela O'Malley, 76, Irish-Spanish activist and educationalist and radical, stroke.
Juan Sánchez-Navarro y Peón, 92, Mexican entrepreneur and co-founder of National Action Party.

13

John Brooke-Little, 78, English author and officer of arms.
Ilan Halimi, French Jew kidnapped and murdered by a gang from a banlieue. Possibly anti-Semitic murder.
Jaakko Honko, 83, Finnish economist.
Andreas Katsulas, 59, American actor (Babylon 5, The Fugitive, Star Trek: The Next Generation), lung cancer.
Alan M. Levin, 79, American documentary filmmaker.
Edna Lewis, 89, American author of cookbooks on Southern U.S. cuisine.
Altynbek Sarsenbayev, 43, Kazakh politician, former cabinet minister, assassinated.
Sir Peter Strawson, 86, British philosopher.
Joseph Ujlaki, 76, Hungarian-born French football player.
Wang Xuan, 70, Chinese academic and IT expert.
Bettie Wilson, 115, American supercentenarian who was Mississippi's oldest person, complications from congestive heart failure.

14

Ramon Bagatsing, 89, Filipino politician, Mayor of Manila, cardiac arrest.
Yehuda Chitrik, 106, Russian-born rabbi and Lubavitch storyteller.
Darry Cowl, 80, French actor and pianist, lung cancer.
Shoshana Damari, 83, Yemeni-born Israeli singer, "Queen of Israeli song," pneumonia.
Joel Dorius, 87, American professor of literature, bone marrow cancer.
Michael G. Fitzgerald, 55, American film historian and author.
Lynden David Hall, 31, British soul singer, Hodgkin's lymphoma.
Benjamin Matthews, 72, American bass-baritone opera singer, co-founder of Opera Ebony.
Tage Møller, 91, Danish Olympic cyclist.
Don Paarlberg, 94, American agricultural economics adviser to three U.S. Presidents.
Michael Posner, 74, British economist.
Robert Taylor Sr., 89, American businessman, miniature golf pioneer.
Putte Wickman, 81, Swedish jazz orchestra leader and clarinetist, cancer.

15

Barbara Guest, 85, American poet of the New York School.
Anna Marly, 88, Russian-born songwriter, France's "Troubadour of the Resistance.".
Andrei Petrov, 75, Russian composer.
Robert E. Rich, Sr., 92, American businessman, creator of first non dairy whipped topping.
Sun Yun-suan, 93, Chinese engineer and politician, former Premier of Republic of China, heart attack.
Josip Vrhovec, 79, Croatian Yugoslav communist politician, former foreign minister of Yugoslavia.
Lim Hock Soon, 41, murder victim who was shot to death in Singapore by former acquaintance and gangster Tan Chor Jin

16

Paul Avrich, 74, American professor and historian of anarchism, Alzheimer's disease.
Benno Besson, 83, Swiss stage director.
Johnny Grunge, 39, American pro wrestler, sleep apnea complications.
Sid Feller, 89, American music arranger, conductor and record producer.
Dennis Kirkland, 63, British television producer and director, after a short illness.
Ernie Stautner, 80, German-born American football player (Pittsburgh Steelers) and member of the Pro Football Hall of Fame, Alzheimer's disease.

17

Ray Barretto, 76, American-born Latin jazz percussionist and bandleader, heart failure.
Sybille Bedford, 94, German-born British novelist and memoirist.
Paul Carr, 72, American actor (Akira, Raise the Titanic, Star Trek), lung cancer.
Bill Cowsill, 58, American singer, lead of The Cowsills, emphysema and other ailments.
Gertrude Ganote, 86, American baseball player (AAGPBL).
Harold Hunter, 31, American pro skateboarder, in movie Kids, suspected drug overdose.
Bob Lewis, 81, American race horse owner, congestive heart failure.
Jorge Pinto Mendonça, 51, Brazilian football player, heart attack.
Yevgeny Samoilov, 94, Russian actor.

18

Richard Bright, 68, American actor (The Godfather, Marathon Man, Once Upon a Time in America), traffic collision.
Bill Hartley, 75, Australian political activist and trade unionist.
Laurel Hester, 49, American gay rights activist, lung cancer.
Charles Leonard, 92, American US Army Major General and Olympic sharpshooter.
Tom Sellers, 83, American newspaper reporter and 1955 Pulitzer Prize winner, heart attack.
Ruth Taylor, 44, Canadian poet, alcohol poisoning.
Saulius Mykolaitis, 40, Lithuanian director, actor, and singer-songwriter.

19

Angelo Brignole, 81, Italian cyclist.
Ken Keuffel, 82, American college football coach, prostate cancer.
Erna Lazarus, 102, American screenwriter.
Edward H. McNamara, 79, American county official.

20

Lou Gish, 35, British stage, film and television actress, cancer.
Curt Gowdy, 86, American sports broadcaster, leukemia.
Paul Marcinkus, 84, American Catholic archbishop, President of Vatican Bank and Pro-President of Vatican City State.
Lucjan Wolanowski, 86, Polish journalist, writer and traveller.

21

Gennadiy Aygi, 71, Russian author and poet who wrote in the Chuvash language.
Theodore Draper, 93, American historian and political commentator.
Mirko Marjanović, 68, Serbian politician, Prime Minister of Serbia (1994–2000).
Angelica Rozeanu, 84, Romanian-born table tennis world champion, cirrhosis.
Stefan Terlezki, 78, British Conservative Member of Parliament 1983–1987.

22

Bill Bagnall, 80, American magazine publisher and editor (Motorcyclist).
Atwar Bahjat, 30, Iraqi journalist for al-Arabiya, abducted and killed in Iraq.
Anthony Burger, 44, American gospel music pianist, collapsed during performance.
Hilde Domin, 96, German poet and writer.
Donelson Hoopes, 73, American curator.
Edward Nalbandian, 78, American businessman, owner of Zachary All Clothing in Los Angeles, Alzheimer's disease.
Flossie Page, 112, American supercentenarian, oldest person from Kansas.
S. Rajaratnam, 90, Singaporean politician, first Senior Minister of Singapore, heart failure.
John Sullivan, 61, English cricketer.
Bill Tung, 72, Hong Kong actor, horse racing commentator.
Richard Wawro, 52, Scottish autistic savant internationally recognized artist, cancer.

23

Giuseppe Amici, 67, Sammarinese politician, former Captain Regent of San Marino.
Frederick Busch, 64, American author, heart attack.
Said Mohamed Djohar, 87, Comorian politician, former President of Comoros.
 Muhammad Shamsul Huq, 93, Bangladeshi academic and former Minister of Foreign Affairs.
Luna Leopold, 90, American ecologist and author.
Machteld Mellink, 88, Netherlands-born American archaeologist of sites in Anatolia.
Diane Shalet, 71, American actress and author.
Earl Stallings, 89, American Baptist minister and activist, praised by Martin Luther King Jr. in the "Letter from Birmingham Jail".
Telmo Zarraonaindía, 85, Spanish football player, heart attack.

24

Octavia Butler, 58, American science fiction author and MacArthur Foundation Fellow, head injury.
Harold Faragher, 88, English cricketer.
Don Knotts, 81, American actor (The Andy Griffith Show, Three's Company, The Ghost and Mr. Chicken), 5-time Emmy winner, complications from pneumonia and lung cancer.
John Martin, 58, Canadian broadcaster, throat cancer.
Andrew Sherratt, 59, British archaeologist at the University of Sheffield, heart failure.
Denis Twitchett, 80, British Sinologist and scholar, Gordon Wu Professor of Chinese Studies, Princeton University (1980–1994), creator of the 15 volume The Cambridge History of China.
Dennis Weaver, 81, American actor (Gunsmoke, McCloud, Duel), Emmy winner (1959), complications from cancer.

25

Kenneth Deane, 45, Canadian police officer convicted in Ipperwash shooting, automobile accident.
Thomas Koppel, 61, Danish musician and composer from the band Savage Rose.
Liang Lingguang, 89, Chinese Communist revolutionary and politician, Minister of Light Industry (1977–1980), Mayor of Guangzhou (1980–1983), Governor of Guangdong (1983–1985).
Darren McGavin, 83, American actor (Kolchak: The Night Stalker, A Christmas Story, Mickey Spillane's Mike Hammer).
Henry M. Morris, 87, American young earth creationist leader, complications of stroke.
Tsegaye Gabre-Medhin, 69, Ethiopian Poet Laureate, kidney disease.
Imette St. Guillen, 24, American Hispanic John Jay College of Criminal Justice student, murdered.
Charlie Wayman, 83, English footballer, during the 1940s and 1950s, following a long illness.

26

Georgina Battiscombe, 100, British author & biographer.
Bill Cardoso, 68, American writer and editor, coined the term "gonzo", heart failure.
Noel Diprose, 83, Australian cricketer.
Sir Hans Singer, 95, German-born British economist, helped create the World Food Program and the United Nations Development Program.
Charlie Wayman, 84, English footballer (Southampton, Preston North End).

27

 Alice Baker, 107, British World War I service veteran, last surviving British woman to serve in the First World War, member of the Royal Flying Corps.
Ferenc Bene, 61, Hungarian football player, fall.
Otis Chandler, 78, American former publisher of the Los Angeles Times, Lewy body disease.
Fahd Faraj al-Juwair, 36, Saudi Arabian alleged head of al-Qaeda in the Arabian peninsula, killed in foiled bombing attempt.
Milton Katims, 96, American violist and conductor, long-time conductor and leader of the Seattle Symphony.
Tsakani Mhinga, 27, South African R&B singer, drug overdose.
William Musto, 88, American politician, former mayor of Union City, New Jersey, convicted of racketeering.
Robert Lee Scott, Jr., 97, American general officer, retired United States Air Force brigadier general and fighter ace, author (God is My Co-Pilot).
Linda Smith, 48, British comedian, ovarian cancer.

28

James Ronald "Bunkie" Blackburn, 69, American NASCAR driver.
Owen Chamberlain, 85, American particle physicist, co-discoverer of the antiproton, winner of the 1959 Nobel Prize in Physics, complications from Parkinson's Disease.
Travis Claridge, 27, American football player with the Atlanta Falcons, Carolina Panthers and Hamilton Tiger-Cats, pneumonia.
Hugh McCartney, 86, Scottish politician, former Labour Party MP.
Ron Cyrus, 70, American politician, lung cancer.
Peter Snow, c. 70, New Zealand doctor who discovered "Tapanui flu" (chronic fatigue syndrome).

References

2006-02
 02